Isaac Cofie (born 20 September 1991) is a Ghanaian professional footballer who plays as a midfielder for Sivasspor.

Club career

Genoa
Cofie made his Serie A debut for Genoa C.F.C. on 2 May 2010, when he came on as a substitute in the 64th minute for Alberto Zapater in a game against A.S. Bari.

Torino (loan)
Cofie joined Torino on loan in the 2010–11 Serie B season.

Piacenza (loan)
On 4 January 2011, Cofie's loan to Torino from Genoa CFC was pre-matured. Cofie played for Piacenza until the end of the 2010–11 Serie B season.

Sassuolo (loan)
Cofie then joined Sassuolo on loan for the 2011–12 Serie B season, where he helped Sassuolo to reach the 2011–12 Serie B promotion play-offs, but they lost 3–2 on aggregate to UC Sampdoria over a two-legged tie.

Chievo
In July 2012, Cofie signed a contract with Serie A club Chievo Verona in co-ownership deal, for €1.5 million transfer fee. On 6 January 2013, he scored his first goal for Chievo against Atalanta (Serie A round 19). in June 2013 Genoa bought back Cofie for €5 million, in cash plus player deal (€1.5M cash plus Dejan Lazarević)

Return to Genoa
Cofie played 17 games in 2013–14 Serie A season for Genoa.

Return to Cheivo
On 28 August 2014, Cofie was signed by A.C. Chievo Verona in a temporary deal.

Sporting Gijón
On 7 August 2018, Cofie moved to Spain for signing a two-year contract with Segunda División team Sporting de Gijón.

Sivasspor
In July 2019, he moved to Turkish side Sivasspor. On 2 July 2021, Cofie signed a two-year contract extension with the club.

International career
Cofie made his debut with the Ghana national team on 8 September 2012.

Honours
Sivasspor
 Turkish Cup: 2021–22

References

External links
 
 
 Profile at Genoa

1991 births
Living people
Association football midfielders
Ghanaian footballers
Ghana international footballers
Serie A players
Serie B players
Segunda División players
Süper Lig players
Genoa C.F.C. players
Sporting de Gijón players
Torino F.C. players
Piacenza Calcio 1919 players
U.S. Sassuolo Calcio players
A.C. ChievoVerona players
A.C. Carpi players
Sivasspor footballers
Ghanaian expatriate footballers
Ghanaian expatriate sportspeople in Italy
Ghanaian expatriate sportspeople in Spain
Ghanaian expatriate sportspeople in Turkey
Expatriate footballers in Italy
Expatriate footballers in Spain
Expatriate footballers in Turkey